"That's the Way Love Goes' is a song written by Lefty Frizzell and Sanger D. Shafer and recorded by American country music artist Johnny Rodriguez.  It was released in December 1973 as the second single from the album All I Ever Meant to Do Was Sing.  The song was Rodriguez's fourth hit on the U.S. country chart and third number one in a row. The single stayed at number one for one week and spent a total of 14 weeks on the chart.

Cover versions
Connie Smith recorded the song and made it the title track of her 1974 album That's the Way Love Goes. Frizzell himself recorded a version of the song that, although never charting, has gotten classic country radio airplay.

Merle Haggard released the song in November 1983 as the second and title track from his album That's the Way Love Goes.  Haggard's version was his 30th number one single.  His version spent 21 weeks on the charts and won him that year's Grammy Award for Best Country Vocal Performance — Male. He charted a second rendition of the song in 1999 as a duet with Jewel, taking this version to #56 on the country charts.

In 2019, Crystal Gayle covered the song on her You Don't Know Me album. Ronnie Dunn then recorded his own cover for his 2020 release Re-Dunn, and Alan Jackson covered the song on his 2021 album, Where Have You Gone.

Chart performance

Johnny Rodriguez

Merle Haggard

Merle Haggard and Jewel

References

1973 songs
1973 singles
1983 singles
Johnny Rodriguez songs
Connie Smith songs
Merle Haggard songs
Jewel (singer) songs
Songs written by Sanger D. Shafer
Songs written by Lefty Frizzell
Song recordings produced by Jerry Kennedy
Song recordings produced by Ray Baker (music producer)
Mercury Records singles
Epic Records singles